Accipitriformes is one of three major orders of birds of prey and includes the osprey, hawks, eagles, kites, and vultures. Falcons (Falconiformes) and owls (Strigiformes) are the other two major orders and are listed in other articles. The International Ornithological Committee (IOC) recognizes these 264 species of Accipitriformes distributed among four families. Among them is the family Cathartidae (New World vultures) which the American Ornithological Society (AOS) and the Clements taxonomy place in its own order, Cathartiformes. The list also includes the Bermuda hawk, Bermuteo avivorus, which has been extinct since the early 17th century.

This list is presented according to the IOC taxonomic sequence and can also be sorted alphabetically by common name, family, and binomial.

List

References

See also
List of Accipitriformes by population
List of falcon species
List of owl species

Accipitriformes
Accipitriformes